Maurice James Harquail (born 2 December 1938 in Matapédia, Quebec) was a Liberal party member of the House of Commons of Canada. He was a claim adjuster by career.

He represented New Brunswick's Restigouche electoral district since winning a by-election there on 14 October 1975. He was re-elected in the 1979 and 1980 federal elections, but lost in the 1984 election to Al Girard of the Progressive Conservative party. Harquail served in most of the 30th Canadian Parliament, and in the 31st and 32nd Canadian Parliaments. He subsequently served as a member of the Transportation Safety Board of Canada.

|-
 
|Liberal
|Maurice Harquail
|align="right"|9,158
|align="right"|51.6
|align="right"|-3.9
|-
 
| style="width: 150px" |Progressive Conservative
|Roger Caron
|align="right"|6,059
|align="right"|34.1
|align="right"|+13.2
|-

|New Democratic Party
|Edgar Dugas
|align="right"|1,392
|align="right"|7.8
|align="right"|-2.3
|-

|- bgcolor="white"
!align="left" colspan=3|Total
!align="right"|17,749
!align="right"|
!align="right"|

External links
 

1938 births
Living people
Members of the House of Commons of Canada from New Brunswick
Liberal Party of Canada MPs